Dino Ndlovu (born 15 February 1990) is a South African professional soccer player who plays as a forward for TFF First League club Boluspor and the South Africa national football team.

Early life and career
Ndlovu hails from Jouberton near Klerksdorp. During his formative years, Ndlovu began playing soccer on the streets and when he was sixteen, he was afforded the opportunity to join an Academy of Excellence. He had to turn down the opportunity, however as it would have left his mother alone at home. He later traveled to Johannesburg where he slept in a train station bathroom for three days in order to attend soccer trials with Platinum Stars. He was offered a contract by the club and initially impressed in front of goal at youth level. His form dipped soon after, however, as the new source of income began to serve as a distraction and Platinum Stars elected not to renew his contract in 2011. At the time he was the breadwinner for his family, which included his pregnant wife.

Club career

Bnei Yehuda
Following his release from Platinum Stars, Ndlovu was advised by his agent to leave South Africa. He trialled with Israeli side Bnei Yehuda who signed after just two days.

Anorthosis Famagusta
Ndlovu joined Anorthosis Famagusta in the 2015 summer, passed to the crowds warm attention on a friendly Anorthosis preparation games. Accomplished 6 goals in preparation friendly games only friendlies.

Qarabağ
On 12 August 2016 FK Qarabağ announced they had signed Ndlovu to a two-year contract. During the 2017–18 UEFA Champions League campaign, Ndlovu scored an away goal against FC Copenhagen which helped Qarabağ qualify for the group stages of the tournament for the first time in the club's history

Boluspor
On 10 January 2023, Ndlovu joined TFF First League club Boluspor.

International career
He was recalled to the national team in October 2018. On 13 October, he was one of South Africa's goalscorers as the nation recorded its largest ever victory with a 6–0 win over Seychelles in an Africa Cup of Nations qualifier.

Career statistics

Club

International

Statistics accurate as of match played 13 October 2018

International goals
Scores and results list South Africa's goal tally first.

References

External links

 

1990 births
Living people
South African soccer players
South Africa international soccer players
South African expatriate soccer players
Bnei Yehuda Tel Aviv F.C. players
Maccabi Haifa F.C. players
Anorthosis Famagusta F.C. players
Qarabağ FK players
Zhejiang Professional F.C. players
Changchun Yatai F.C. players
Israeli Premier League players
Cypriot First Division players
Azerbaijan Premier League players
China League One players
TFF First League players
Chinese Super League players
Expatriate footballers in Israel
Expatriate footballers in Cyprus
Expatriate footballers in Azerbaijan
Expatriate footballers in China
Expatriate footballers in Turkey
South African expatriate sportspeople in Israel
South African expatriate sportspeople in Cyprus
South African expatriate sportspeople in Azerbaijan
South African expatriate sportspeople in China
South African expatriate sportspeople in Turkey
Association football forwards